William Johnston Buchanan OBE FBCS CEng PFHEA (born 6 March 1961) is a Scottish computer scientist. Buchanan was born in Falkirk, Scotland in 1961. He currently leads the Blockpass ID Lab and the Centre for Distributed Computing and Security at Edinburgh Napier University. He is a professor in the School of Computing. In 2016, Buchanan was awarded "Cyber Evangelist of the Year" at the first Scottish Cybersecurity awards, along with leading a project that was awarded the best collaborative project with Police Scotland. Buchanan was awarded the best Best Lecturer/Tutor in the School of Computing at Edinburgh Napier University within the student-nominated excellence awards in 2019 and also in 2020.

Buchanan was appointed Officer of the Order of the British Empire (OBE) in the 2017 Birthday Honours for services to cyber security, and was the first person to receive an OBE related to cyber security. In 2018, he received an "Outstanding Contribution to Knowledge Exchange" award at the Scottish Knowledge Exchange awards. Buchanan has led research which has led to three successful spin-out companies: Zonefox, Symphonic and Cyan Forensics. In October 2018, Zonefox was acquired by Fortinet, and in November 2020, Symphonic were acquired by Ping Identity. Buchanan also supported the creation of the MemCrypt spin-out, and which focuses on the discovery of cryptographic keys in memory (based on the PhD work of Dr Peter McLaren). The work has since been applied to ransomware detection and recovery. In 2021, the research work related to MemCrypt received a Leading Light Innovation award at the Scottish Cybersecurity awards. He has co-authored several patents including: Improvements in or relating to digital forensics; Resilient secret sharing cloud based architecture for data vault; System and method for management of confidential data; Method for identification of digital content; and Improved information sharing. In 2022, the EU-funded GLASS project won the Leading Light Innovation Award at the Scottish Cyber Awards, of which Buchanan is the Principal Investigator (PI) for the project. 

He is the creator and sole author of the Asecuritysite.com web site, and which focuses on covering cryptography and various areas of networking and cybersecurity, from both a theoretical and practical approach. Buchanan was also the software creator of the Bright Red Publishing Digital Zone, and which contains Web-based content for many of the subjects included in the Scottish Qualifications Authority (SQA) N5, Higher and Advanced Higher syllabus' in Scotland.

With a documentary on Cyber Security, broadcast on Monday 8 November 2015, Buchanan and his team set up a fake Web site for hackers to gain access to, as part of the BBC Panorama programme. In 2016, Buchanan was also included in the FutureScot list for the "Top 50 Scottish Tech People Who Are Changing The World".

References

1961 births
Living people
Scottish computer scientists
British computer scientists
Academics of Edinburgh Napier University
Fellows of the British Computer Society
Officers of the Order of the British Empire
People from Falkirk
Principal Fellows of the Higher Education Academy
People educated at Graeme High School